The following highways are numbered 268:

Canada
Manitoba Provincial Road 268
Prince Edward Island Route 268

Japan
 Japan National Route 268

United States
 California State Route 268 (former)
 Florida State Road 268 (former)
 Georgia State Route 268
 K-268 (Kansas highway)
Kentucky Route 268
 Maryland Route 268
 Minnesota State Highway 268 (former)
 New Mexico State Road 268
 New York State Route 268
 North Carolina Highway 268
 Pennsylvania Route 268
 South Carolina Highway 268
 Tennessee State Route 268
 Texas State Highway 268 (former)
 Texas State Highway Loop 268
 Texas State Highway Spur 268 (former)
 Farm to Market Road 268 (Texas)
 Utah State Route 268